Scottish Citylink is a long-distance express coach operator in Scotland and Ireland (where it operates as Irish Citylink) and formerly England (where it operated as Stansted Citylink). The company was formed as a subsidiary of Scottish Transport Group in March 1985. It is operated as a 63/37 joint venture between ComfortDelGro and Stagecoach.

Operation
Scottish Citylink operates an extensive network of long-distance express services within Scotland, operating 19 routes linking the cities of Glasgow, Edinburgh, Aberdeen, Dundee, Stirling and Inverness, as well as linking some rural Highland communities to the main urban areas of Scotland. Services also operate to Northern Ireland via the ferry link between Stranraer and Belfast, and there are seasonal workings to Blackpool. In all, over 200 destinations are served by Scottish Citylink within Scotland, using about 90 coaches provided by operators local to the 'destination' area, carrying over three million passengers annually.

Despite the extent of Citylink's operations in Scotland, there are notable geographical regions, including large urban areas, that have poor or no connections with the network. These tend to be areas served by subsidiaries of Stagecoach, which operate their own comprehensive Stagecoach Express network, to destinations such as Ayrshire (Kilmarnock, Ayr and Irvine), Fife (Kirkcaldy, Dunfermline and St Andrews), Dumfries & Galloway, Aberdeenshire and Moray. An exception is the Scottish Borders, which is covered by West Coast Motors, though they have no regular express service.

Citylink also operates in the Republic of Ireland, operating between Dublin, Galway City, Clifden, Cork and Shannon.

History

Scottish Citylink Coaches was formed in 1985 during the reorganisation of the Scottish Bus Group to co-ordinate and manage the long-distance express services operated by the other SBG subsidiaries, particularly the Western Scottish and Eastern Scottish services from Glasgow and Edinburgh to London and the south.

By combining the SBG express network, Citylink became the largest operator of long-distance express services within Scotland, and from Scotland to England and Wales. With the main hubs in Glasgow and Edinburgh, many services to the Highlands and Islands were in some cases vital to rural areas as the only public transport link available.

One vehicle was owned to satisfy licensing conditions, but this was operated as part of the Western Scottish fleet. Citylink itself did not operate any vehicles, but a uniform two-tone blue and yellow livery was introduced for coaches operating Citylink services, with the subsidiary's corporate fleetname displayed on the front and rear of the vehicle.  Previously, only cross-border services had adopted some form of corporate look in the late 1970s, with vehicles wearing a simple but striking blue-and-white livery with bold Scottish fleetnames in the SBG corporate logo style.

Subsidiary companies operated Citylink vehicles on express services originating from their operating area, and where long-distance services spanned one or two operating areas, the routes were shared between the companies. The level of involvement of the subsidiary firms in providing Citylink work varied with size and geography. Central Scottish, Strathtay Scottish, Kelvin Scottish and Clydeside Scottish were the smaller contributors as no major city or destination lay within their main operating regions. Indeed, Clydeside marketed its own express services within its area as Clydeside Quicksliver with its own distinct brand.

As the Scottish Bus Group prepared for privatisation, Citylink franchises were no longer exclusive to the SBG subsidiaries. Private companies such as Rapsons Coaches of Inverness, Henry Crawford Coaches of Neilston, West Coast Motors of Campbeltown, Skye-Ways and Park's of Hamilton were awarded Citylink contracts and provided vehicles of their own for this work. Also seen using a Citylink livery but with the distinctive Ulsterman lettering, Ulsterbus provided coaches for services between Derry or Belfast to Birmingham and London via towns in Dumfries and Galloway. This route was also operated by Dodds of Troon and Western Scottish.

Citylink itself was privatised in August 1990, when sold in a management buyout to its management and employees. As the Scottish Bus Group broke up, the number of private operators working Citylink contracts increased. Park's, West Coast Motors and Rapsons were now major contributors, while the former SBG companies now owned by Stagecoach (Fife Scottish, Western Scottish, Bluebird Buses) began operating their own Stagecoach Express network.

In 1993 Scottish Citylink was sold to National Express. At that time, cross border services to England were replaced by National Express services, leaving Citylink with Scottish domestic services, and co-ordinated timetabling and ticketing was introduced between the two operators. During this period, Citylink took a stake in West Coast Motors, purchased Skye-Ways Coaches and also Highland Country Buses, which was an offshoot of Highland Scottish.

With the privatisation of British Rail, in 1997 National Express won the ScotRail franchise. The Mergers & Monopolies Commission ruled this would give National Express a monopoly on long-distance services in Scotland and ordered the sale of Scottish Citylink.

In August 1998 Scottish Citylink was sold to Metroline, the London-based subsidiary of ComfortDelGro.

In 2002, the company began trading in the Republic of Ireland, acquiring Cummer Commercials, which operated on the Dublin to Galway route (and also traded as CityLink Express). The route has since been rebranded to the yellow-blue Citylink livery (although without the "Scottish" prefix) and has expanded to provide services from Galway to Shannon.

In December 2021, as part of its merger with National Express, Stagecoach agreed terms to sell its shareholding to ComfortDelGro to satisfy the Competition & Markets Authority. However after the merger with National Express was cancelled, the sale did not proceed with Stagecoach increasing  its shareholding to 37.5% as part of a deal for Scottish Citylink to take over the sale of Falcon and Megabus tickets.

Present

The company's current head office is at Buchanan bus station in Glasgow, where many of its services start and terminate. Citylink itself does not operate or own buses in its own right, although one owned and operated by Stagecoach West Scotland carries CityLink accreditation to satisfy licensing conditions. The two-tone blue and yellow colour scheme is still used, though its application and style have changed over the years.

From 2004, the operating companies faced heavy competition from Megabus and Motorvator, both subsidiaries of Stagecoach. In September 2005 ComfortDelGro and Stagecoach agreed to a joint venture to provide express coach services in Scotland, ending the competition between the two operators. Under the terms of the agreement, Stagecoach gained a 35% shareholding in Scottish Citylink and in return granted certain rights to the Megabus and Motorvator brands in Scotland.

Despite being a minority shareholder, Stagecoach appeared to have assumed operational control. Stagecoach staff replaced much of the former Citylink management, while Stagecoach's Scottish subsidiaries began operating many of the routes formerly operated by subcontractors displaced from Citylink work. Citylink service numbers, timetables and routes were also sacrificed in favour of Megabus where the two brands overlapped.

In March 2006 the Competition Commission launched an investigation and ruled that the joint venture substantially reduced competition and that evidence suggested it led to higher fares on some routes. Stagecoach immediately criticised the ruling, stating that a period of further consultation would cause uncertainty among passengers and leave vital services in limbo, while jeopardising Scotland's intercity coach network and its ability to compete with both train and car  Criticism of the Competition Commission's draft findings grew in Scotland and the joint venture received support from across the political spectrum in the Scottish Parliament In early 2008, certain routes, which were at the time already contacted out to Park's, were divested to comply with the ruling.

Today many of the services are operated by Stagecoach subsidiaries Stagecoach East Scotland, Stagecoach Highlands and Stagecoach West Scotland. Some services are operated by Edinburgh Coach Lines, Shiel Buses and West Coast Motors.

Citylink Gold

In 2010, Citylink launched the "Gold" brand for services between Glasgow and Aberdeen or Inverness. The Citylink Gold brand is similar to the Stagecoach Gold brand used by Stagecoach bus subsidiaries, and offers a more luxurious service with leather seats, free wi-fi and extra services aboard. The service is also intended to provide quicker journeys than the regular bus routes which may service significant numbers of smaller towns and settlements along their routes, though may stop at those towns or settlements deemed to be important to serve. With Citylink Gold, passengers are offered free tea, coffee, cold drinks and snacks on the coach. As of May 2019, Five return services per day in each direction on routes from Glasgow to Aberdeen and four return services from Glasgow to Inverness, additionally, three Edinburgh to Inverness return services and also four Edinburgh to Aberdeen return services, all now designated as Citylink Gold. Fares have remained the same with Super Singles available on the routes as they were whilst under standard Citylink branding. The Citylink Gold services are as follows:
G9 Glasgow – Aberdeen
G10 Glasgow – Aviemore – Inverness
G90 Edinburgh – Perth – Pitlochry – Aviemore – Inverness
G92 Edinburgh – Halbeath – Dundee – Aberdeen

Stansted Citylink
On 11 December 2015, a St Pancras railway station to Stansted Airport service commenced under the Stansted Citylink banner. It ceased in October 2017.

References

External links

Scottish Citylink website

Coach operators in England
Coach operators in Scotland
Companies based in Glasgow
ComfortDelGro companies
Stagecoach Group
Transport in Scotland
Transport companies established in 1985
1985 establishments in Scotland